The 24th Serbia Division (Serbo-Croatian Latin: Dvadesetčetvrta srpska divizija) was a Yugoslav Partisan division formed on 10 June 1944 as the 4th Serbia Division in Jablanica. It was formed from the 11th and 17th Serbia Brigades which numbered around 2000 fighters in total. Soon after the formation the 13th and the 15th Serbia Brigades were also added to the division. The division was under the direct command of the Supreme Headquarters until 6 September 1944 when it became a part of the 13th Corps. Its commander was Mile Čalović while its political commissar was Dimitrije Vrbica.

References 

Divisions of the Yugoslav Partisans
Military units and formations established in 1944